The Paraguayan Football Association (APF) (Guarani: Paraguái Mangapy Atyguasu), is the omnibus governing body of football in Paraguay. It organizes the Paraguayan football league, including futsal and beach soccer, as well as and the Paraguay national football team. It is based in the city of Luque, near the capital city, Asunción. Football is the most popular sport in Paraguay.

History 
In the late 1890s William Paats brought soccer to Paraguay, when it was then played at an Asunción teacher’s college. Escuela Normal de Maestros.

In 1906, five existing Paraguayan football teams (Olimpia, Guaraní, Libertad, General Díaz, and Nacional) created the governing body of football in Paraguay, the Paraguayan Football League. In 1998 it adopted its current name. In June 18, 1906, the representatives of the five existing football teams in Paraguay at that time (Olimpia, Guaraní, Libertad, General Díaz, and Nacional) met to establish the Paraguayan Football League, named Liga Paraguaya de Football Association. The first match was played on a Sunday, July 8, 1906.  Adolfo Riquelme, who was a well known Paraguayan journalist, was the organization’s  first president.

In 1921, during the presidency of Enrique Pinho, the Paraguayan Football League joined the South American Football Confederation (CONMEBOL). In 1925 it became a member of FIFA.   

In 1941 it changed its name to Liga Paraguaya de Football and in 1957 the name was Hispanicized as Liga Paraguaya de Fútbol. 

On December 3, 1998, its name was changed to its current denomination, Asociación Paraguaya de Fútbol, which coincidentally is one of the names that had been adopted by a dissident football association that brought together some teams, which would later join the League, and which organized championships between 1911 and 1917.

In 2016, APF appointed Robert Harrison, the former head of Club Nacional, as president. Harrison succeeded Alejandro Domínguez, who resigned to run for president of CONMEBOL, after Juan Ángel Napout stepped down from that role in December 2015.

In 2019, APF hired Argentinian Eduardo Berizzo as manager of the Paraguay's national men's team.

Paraguay have not previously hosted the FIFA World Cup.  In August 2022, APF joined up with the football associations of Argentina, Uruguay, and Chile to jointly bid to host the World Cup in 2030.

Institutional Succession 
From its foundation in 1906 until it adopted its final name in 1998, the APF followed the following institutional trajectory::

Honours

Copa América champions  1953, 1979
Olympic Games silver medal (Athens 2004)
FIFA World Cup 8 participations  1930, 1950, 1958, 1986, 1998, 2002, 2006, 2010

The Paraguay national team appeared in the World Cup finals eight times, reaching the quarter finals in the world FIFA event in South Africa (2010), losing to the eventual tournament victor, a Spanish team. 

The Club Olimpia has been indomitable: 38 Paraguayan championship titles; 3 in the Copa Libertadores  the continental South American soccer tournament (1979, 1990, 2002); and Intercontinental cup.

Leadership and staff

Presidents

Liga Paraguaya de Football Association

Liga Paraguaya de Football

Liga Paraguaya de Fútbol

Asociación Paraguaya de Fútbol

Association staff (2022)

Paraguayan football league system 

The football in Paraguay has four levels in men's tournaments (five in the interior of the country) and one division in women's tournaments. The Paraguayan Football Association with an affiliated association called the Interior Football Union (UFI) -which consists of 17 federations, one for each department of the country, excluding the city of Asunción-, organizes the different championships. 

The most popular football teams in Paraguay are Olimpia, Cerro Porteño, Guaraní, Libertad and Nacional. All of them are from Asunción.
 
The Supercopa Paraguay is a national cup played since 2021. It is single match, on a neutral field that faces the champion of Primera División and the champion of Copa Paraguay, a competition created in 2018 with teams of all categories, including the federations that belong to UFI.
 
There is also a category for the reserve of the football teams called Categoría Reserva and then the formative divisions from 14 to 19 years. The women’s division also has a U-18 category. 

Regarding futsal, it is organized in four categories: a premium league, the Honor Category,  Primera and Intermedia. There is also a category for women.  

The APF also organizes two beach soccer championships, the Tournament of Stars and the Women’s Beach Soccer Tournament.

Controversy
The freedom of players to be contractually released and transfer between clubs and negotiate contracts (commonly called a "buyout clause") has been controversial, and subject to both scholarly inquiry and legal proceedings.

See also
2022 Copa Paraguay
Copa Paraguay
Paraguayan Primera División
Paraguay national football team
Football in Paraguay
Paraguayan Footballer of the Year
Paraguay women's national football team
Paraguayan Tercera División
Sport in Paraguay
Estadio Defensores del Chaco
2019 FIFA Beach Soccer World Cup
Juan Ángel Napout
Juan Escobar (Paraguayan footballer)
Paraguay women's national under-20 football team

References

Further reading

External links

Official APF site
Paraguay at FIFA site

Paraguay
Football in Paraguay
Sports governing bodies in Paraguay
Sports organizations established in 1906
1906 establishments in Paraguay